The World Group was the highest level of Fed Cup competition in 2011. Eight nations competed in a three-round knockout competition. Italy was the two-time defending champion, but they were defeated in the semifinals by four-time former champion Russia.

The Russians were defeated in the final by Czech Republic, 3–2, in their first final and title since 1988.

Participating Teams

Draw

First round

Italy vs. Australia

France vs. Russia

Czech Republic vs. Slovakia

Belgium vs. United States

Semifinals

Italy vs. Russia

Czech Republic vs. Belgium

Final

Russia vs. Czech Republic

References

See also
Fed Cup structure

World